The Cyprian Norwid Theatre in Jelenia Góra is a Polish repertory theatre founded in 1945. The Norwid Theatre in Jelenia Góra has two stages: Main Stage (540 seats) and Studio Stage (100 seats). The theatre is named after Cyprian Norwid.

Polish actress and stage director Alina Obidniak was an intendant of the Cyprian Norwid Theatre between 1973 and 1988, as well as in year 2000. Obidniak invited many renowned theatre directors to Jelenia Góra, particularly Krystian Lupa, where he began his directing career with the production of Dainty Shapes and Hairy Apes by Witkacy (1978). She travelled with the theatre's productions across Europe and South America. In 1983, the Cyprian Norwid Theatre co-organised early Festival of Street Theatre in Jelenia Góra.

References 

Theatres in Poland
Buildings and structures in Jelenia Góra
Tourist attractions in Jelenia Góra
1945 establishments in Poland